The Gnome-Rhône 9K Mistral was a nine-cylinder 550 hp (405 kW) to 700 hp air-cooled radial engine, that started life as an enlarged Gnome-Rhône 7K with two extra cylinders.

Design and development
The Gnome-Rhône 7K itself was an enlarged version of the Gnome-Rhône 5K which was derived from a licensed version of the Bristol Titan. A redesign of the cylinders is indicated by the K suffix.  The 9K was followed by the larger and more powerful 14-cylinder twin row Gnome-Rhône 14K.

The 9K was license produced by Hungarian company Weiss Manfréd Repülogép- és Motorgyár Rt. (WM Rt, the aircraft engine factory of Manfred Weiss). The engine was used successfully in the MÁVAG Héja and Weiss WM-21 Sólyom aircraft. The 9K was also produced in the Soviet Union as the M-75 at GAZ-29 in Zaporozhye.  Only small numbers were built and it was dropped in favor of the M-25 a version of the Wright Cyclone and the M-85 a version of the Gnome-Rhône 14K Mistral Major.

Variants
9K
9Kbr
9Kdr
9Kdrs
9Kers
9Kfr

I.A.R. 9KIc40Licence production in Romania by Industria Aeronautică Română (IAR).

Applications
Breguet Calcutta
IAR-15
Loire 70
Morane-Saulnier M.S.225
SNCAC NC.510
Wibault 313
Wibault 365

Specifications (9Kd)

See also

References

1920s aircraft piston engines
Aircraft air-cooled radial piston engines
9K
M-75